Kaliber 44 is a hip hop band formed at the end of 1994 in Katowice, Poland. The group is dubbed the most influential Polish hip hop band, while their so-called hardcore psycho rap style is the most prominent. As revealed by Abradab in an interview aired on TVP, "the name comes from the time we weren't completely sane and played gangsta". Later on members provided a revised interpretation: first part of the name indicates the calibre of problems the group sings about. The number 44 is a reference to a prophetic poem Dziady written by Polish poet Adam Mickiewicz.

Nad ludy i nad króle podniesiony;
Na trzech stoi koronach, a sam bez korony;
A życie jego – trud trudów,
A tytuł jego – lud ludów;
Z matki obcej, krew jego dawne bohatery,
A imię jego czterdzieści i cztery.

Elevated above peoples and kings;
He stands on three crowns, but himself is without a crown;
And his life – the hardest of hardships,
And his title – the people above other peoples;
From a foreign mother, his blood is of ancient heroes;
And his name forty and four.

"Księga Tajemnicza. Prolog", released in 1996 was the first Polish hardcore psychorap album and the second one where live-scratching technique was used. Their two other albums – "W 63 minuty dookoła świata" (released in 1998) and "3:44" (released in 2000) were completely devoid of psychorap style.

Piotr Łuszcz 
Soon after release of the second album "W 63 minuty dookoła świata" Magik retired from Kaliber 44, and formed new band called "Paktofonika" together with Sebastian "Rahim" Salbert and Wojciech "Fokus" Alszer.

On 26 December 2000, at around 6:15, "Magik" committed suicide by jumping out of the window of his apartment situated on the ninth floor of the building, in Katowice. At around 6:45, he was pronounced dead in a local hospital, leaving his wife Justyna, and a 3-year-old son, Filip.

Discography

Studio albums

Demo albums

Singles 

"Magia i miecz" (The Magic and the Sword) (1996)
"Film" (The Trip) (1998)
"Konfrontacje" (Confrontations) (2000)

References

External links
Kaliber 44 at Culture.pl

Polish hip hop groups